Pandoraea oxalativorans is a Gram-negative, aerobic, non-spore-forming bacterium of the genus Pandoraea.

References

External links
Type strain of Pandoraea oxalativorans at BacDive -  the Bacterial Diversity Metadatabase

Burkholderiaceae